Mitochondrial uncoupling protein 2 is a protein that in humans is encoded by the UCP2 gene.

Mitochondrial uncoupling proteins (UCP) are members of the larger family of mitochondrial anion carrier proteins (MACP). UCPs separate, or uncouple, oxidative phosphorylation from ATP synthesis by dissipating the mitochondrial membrane potential as heat, also referred to as the mitochondrial proton leak. UCPs facilitate the transfer of anions from the inner to the outer mitochondrial membrane and the return transfer of protons from the outer to the inner mitochondrial membrane. They also reduce the mitochondrial membrane potential in mammalian cells, which reduces production of reactive oxygen species (ROS). 

In contrast to UCP1 and UCP3, which are primarily expressed in adipose and smooth muscle, UCP2 is expressed on many different tissues including the kidney, liver, GI tract, brain, and skeletal muscle.

The exact mechanisms of anion transfer by UCPs are not known. UCPs contain the three homologous protein domains of MACPs. Although it was originally thought to play a role in non-shivering thermogenesis, obesity, diabetes and atherosclerosis, it now appears that the main function of UCP2 is the control of mitochondria-derived reactive oxygen species. 

Chromosomal order is 5'-UCP3-UCP2-3'.

See also
 Uncoupling protein

References

Further reading

Solute carrier family